Khaled bin Alwaleed Al Saud (born 21 April 1978) is a Saudi prince, entrepreneur, and investor. He is the son of Al-Waleed bin Talal and his first wife and cousin, Dalal bint Saud. Khaled has been noted for his vegan lifestyle. He is a grandson of King Saud of Saudi Arabia on his mother's side and he is a great-grandson of King Abdulaziz, the founder of the Kingdom of Saudi Arabia, on both his mother's and father's side.

Early life and education
According to his official biography, Khaled was born in California and raised in Riyadh. At age 14, he suffered a crushed skull during a jet skiing accident in France, but eventually made a full recovery. He graduated in business from the University of New Haven before going to work for Citigroup.

Career
Khaled is the founder and chief executive officer of KBW Investments and KBW Ventures, and founder of property developer Arada. Through his companies, he is an investor in Italian crane manufacturer Raimondi, in Beyond Meat, in tech news website TechnoBuffalo, in ESG capital firm Eat Well Investment Group (EWGFF) and in Square, Inc. He has also been an investor in and board member of JUST, Inc. He was named as one of a number of high-profile investors in the $17 million Series A round of investments in lab-grown meat startup Memphis Meats. In 2018, Khaled announced plans to open a chain of 30 vegan restaurants in the Middle East. The same year, he was named Technology Investor of the Year at Arabian Business CEO Middle East awards. On 9 September 2021 Prince Khaled  has joined Eat Well Investment Group Inc. as a strategic adviser.

Personal life
Khaled is the son of Al-Waleed bin Talal and Dalal bint Saud. Khaled married Munira bint Ibrahim Al Assaf, daughter of Ibrahim Al Assaf.

In the 1990s, Khaled was known for his opulence and extensive collection of 200 luxury cars. After participating in a trophy hunt in South Africa, a trip he would later describe as "cowardly", Khaled adopted a more austere lifestyle, ultimately becoming a vegan and disposing of his automobile collection. He has been described as an environmentalist and has called for the abolition of zoos, reportedly purchases carbon offsets for his travel and drives an electric Tesla X P90D. Khaled's father was reportedly inspired by his son's adoption of veganism to become a vegan himself.

See also
 List of vegans

References

Notes

External links
 Official website

Khalid
1978 births
Living people
Citigroup employees
People from Riyadh
Khalid
Khalid
University of New Haven alumni
Veganism activists